Michael Richard Daniell Foot,  (14 December 1919 – 18 February 2012) was a British political and military historian, and former British Army intelligence officer with the Special Operations Executive during the Second World War.

Biography
The son of a career soldier, Foot was educated at Winchester College and New College, Oxford, where he became involved romantically with Iris Murdoch.

Foot joined the British Army on the outbreak of the Second World War and was commissioned into a Royal Engineers searchlight battalion. In 1941 searchlight units transferred to the Royal Artillery. His service number was 85455. By 1942, he was serving at Combined Operations Headquarters, but wanting to see action he joined the SAS as an intelligence officer and was parachuted into France after D-Day. He was for a time a prisoner of war, and was severely injured during one of his attempts to escape. For his service with the French Resistance he was twice mentioned in despatches and awarded the Croix de Guerre. He ended the war as a major. After the war he remained in the Territorial Army, transferring to the Intelligence Corps in 1950.

After the war Foot taught at Oxford University for eight years before becoming Professor of Modern History at Manchester University in 1967.  His experiences during the war gave him a lifelong interest in the European resistance movements, intelligence matters and the experiences of prisoners of war.  This led him to become the official historian of SOE, with privileged access to its records, allowing him to write some of the first, and still definitive, accounts of its wartime work, especially in France.  Even so, SOE in France took four years to get clearance.

Personal life
Foot was very distantly related to his namesake Michael Foot. He was at one time married to the British philosopher Philippa Foot (née Bosanquet), the granddaughter of U.S. President Grover Cleveland. Foot's second wife was Elizabeth King, with whom he had a son and a daughter, the historian Sarah Foot. In 1972 Foot married Mirjam Romme, who under her married name became a distinguished historian of bookbinding.

Honours
Foot was appointed a Commander of the Order of the British Empire (CBE) in 2001. He also received the Territorial Decoration for Long Service in the Territorial Army.

Bibliography

Books
Gladstone and Liberalism (1952) with J. L. Hammond
British Foreign Policy since 1898 (1956)
Men in Uniform: Military Manpower in Modern Industrial Societies (1961)
SOE in France. An Account of the Work of the British Special Operations Executive in France 1940–1944 (1966)
The Gladstone Diaries (from 1968) editor
War and Society: Historical Essays in Honour and Memory of J. R. Western 1926–1971 (1973) editor
Resistance – An Analysis of European Resistance to Nazism 1940–1945 (1977)
Six Faces of Courage (1978)
MI9: Escape and Evasion 1939–1945 (1979) with J. M. Langley
Little Resistance: Teenage English Girl's Adventures in Occupied France (1982) with Antonia Hunt, née Lyon-Smith
SOE, The Special Operations Executive 1940–1946 (1984)
Art and War: Twentieth Century Warfare as Depicted By War Artists (1990)
Open and Secret War, 1938-1945 (1991)
Oxford Companion to World War II (1995) with I. C. B. Dear
Foreign Fields: The Story of an SOE Operative (1997)
SOE in the Low Countries (2001)
Secret Lives: Lifting the Lid on Worlds of Secret Intelligence (2002) editor
The Next Moon: The Remarkable True Story of a British Agent Behind the Lines in Wartime France (2004) with Ewen Southby-Tailyour and André Hue
Clandestine Sea Operations in the Mediterranean, North Africa and the Adriatic 1940–1944 with Richard Brooks, Routledge, 2004, 
Memories of an SOE Historian (2008)

Articles
"Great Britain and Luxemburg 1867" (English Historical Review, July 1952)

Book reviews

Notes

External links
M. R. D. Foot at Spartacus Educational

British Army Officers 1939−1945

1919 births
2012 deaths
British World War II prisoners of war
World War II prisoners of war held by Germany
Officers of the Order of Orange-Nassau
Recipients of the Legion of Honour
Military personnel from London
Academics of the Victoria University of Manchester
Alumni of New College, Oxford
British Army personnel of World War II
British historians
Commanders of the Order of the British Empire
Intelligence Corps officers
People educated at Winchester College
Recipients of the Croix de Guerre 1939–1945 (France)
Royal Artillery officers
Royal Engineers officers
Special Air Service officers